The 1996 Regal Scottish Masters was a professional non-ranking snooker tournament that took place between 24 and 29 September 1996 at the Motherwell Civic Centre in Motherwell, Scotland.

Stephen Hendry was the defending champion, but he lost in the quarter-finals to Alan McManus.

Peter Ebdon defeated McManus in the final, to win his first Scottish Masters title.

Prize Fund
The breakdown of prize money for this year is shown below:
Winner: £60,000
Runner-up: £28,000
Semi-final: £14,500
Quarter-final: £8,500
Round 1: £4,750
High break: £5,000
Total: £175,000

Main draw

Century breaks

 138, 127  Alan McManus
 127  Peter Ebdon
 122  Stephen Hendry
 119  John Higgins
 104  Ronnie O'Sullivan

References 

Scottish Masters
Scottish Masters
Scottish Masters
Scottish Masters